Tardigrade specific proteins are specific types of intrinsically disordered proteins that are seen in tardigrades. They are most notably used to help them survive desiccation which makes them very extremotolerant.  Likely because of their flexibility, tardigrade specific proteins are strongly influenced by their environment, leading to strong changes during extreme abiotic environments.

History 
The mechanism of protection by tardigrades was originally thought to be as a result of high levels of the sugar trehalose. Trehalose has been shown to help other organisms like yeast through desiccation by working with heat shock proteins and helping proteins that are sensitive to desiccation and keeping them in solution.  However, when tested in tardigrades, low or even no levels of trehalose is found, making the this theory debated in tardigrades. Research into other species that survived prolonged periods without water led to the discovery of Late Embryogenesis Abundant proteins, which provide protection to organisms like cotton seeds, that are desiccation tolerant as an embryo. Trehalose is seen to accumulate in tardigrades and is not sufficient to provide protection and tardigrade specific proteins are needed for them to survive their tun state

Anhydrobiosis is a complex process that not only accounts for the loss of water, but also the damage caused by stress. Following research into anhydrobiosis, it is seen that the process of rehydration is facilitated by a group of molecules, not by just one.

Function 
Tardigrade specific proteins are a type of intrinsically disordered protein. This means that they have no specific shape unlike traditional proteins which rely on their folding to perform a specific task. These proteins use many different conformations, called an ensemble, to move through different structures. Because of this, it is likely that IDPs react strongly to the environment they are in. There are three families of tardigrade specific proteins. They are each named after where the protein is localized within a cell. These proteins are similar to late embryogenesis abundant proteins, except for their specificity to tardigrades. The three families do not resemble each other and are found to be expressed or enriched during desiccation. Unlike traditional proteins, intrinsically disordered proteins are not found to precipitate out of solution or denature during high heat. Tardigrades rely on these proteins to help them survive extreme environments, where they put their bodies in a dehydrated state called a tun. This state allows them to survive many abiotic factors like freezing and heat. The dehydration causes problems for cells, which typically rely on a hydrated environment for their proteins to perform many functions. Tardigrade specific proteins help the contents to not aggregate when first dehydrated and then maintain membrane integrity upon rehydration.

Discovery of the Cytoplasmic and Secreted Abundant Heat Soluble proteins were found when searching for late embryogenesis abundant proteins in tardigrades.

Types

Cytoplasmic 
Cytoplasmic abundant heat soluble proteins have been seen to be highly expressed in response to desiccation. The oldest theory in the mechanism of cytoplasmic abundant heat soluble proteins is the vitrification hypothesis in which when the organism dries, the viscosity within the cell would increase so much that denaturation and membrane fusion in proteins would stop. A second theory is the water replacement theory in which the cytoplasmic abundant heat soluble proteins replaces water in the proteins, protecting the bonds that would normally be affected by the hydrogen in water. It is seen that CAHS proteins are dispersed throughout the cell in normal conditions, but then forms a network of filaments during stressed conditions. This state is reversible and the proteins deaggregate when exposed to non-stress conditions.

Based on experiments with CAHS proteins, it is hypothesized that they have long helical domains that interact in a coiled manner to form the gel-like matrix. These interactions are led by the fact that they are partially disordered with two flexible tails surrounding the helical domains.

CAHS proteins have been studied with trehalose and it has been seen that they interact to provide more protection. Trehalose, rather than other molecules like sucrose, was seen to interact better with specifically CAHS proteins. This further deepens the question of how trehalose interacts with tardigrades and how they survive extreme environments.

Scientists observed that during desiccation a network of filaments transform the cytoplasm into a gel-like state and prevent the cell from collapsing as water leached out.

Secreted 
Secreted abundant heat soluble proteins have been noted to be similar to fatty acid binding proteins, notably in their structure with an antiparallel beta-barrel and internal fatty acid binding pocket. Denoted by their name, they are often secreted into media and often associated with special extracellular structures. Dried tardigrades have been seen to have an abundance of secretory cells which when rehydrated, are not seen. The mechanism behind secreted abundant heat soluble proteins has not been determined yet but the presence of secretory cells only during desiccation leads to an understanding that there is some damage protection by the membrane.

Mitochondrial 
Mitochondrial abundant heat soluble proteins are localized in the mitochondria and are responsible for protecting the mitochondria during desiccation. Because of its work with reactive oxygen species, the mitochondria is an important organelle to protect in extreme environments. It has been seen that the mitochondria of desiccated tardigrades is much smaller than their rehydrated counterparts with a loss of cristae. It is thought that the mitochondrial abundant heat soluble proteins act to replace water in the membrane of the mitochondria, preventing uneven rehydration and breaking of the membrane.

References 

Tardigrades
Xerophiles
Proteins
Molecular biology